Cinderella and the Prince, or The Castle of Heart's Desire - A Fairy Excuse for Songs and Dances in 3 Acts is a musical with music by Louis F. Gottschalk and Edward W. Carliss, lyrics by D.K. Stevens, and R.A. Barnett, and additional musical numbers by D.J. Sullivan, J. S. Chipman, and D.K. Stevens.  It was published by White-Smith Music Publishing Company of Boston in 1904.

Songs
"Katy Didn't" (Gottschalk)
"Oh Miss White" (Sullivan)
"Cinderella" (Corliss)
"Mannie Hadn't Been, You Know, Very Long in Town"  (Gottschalk)
"Dottie's Dimples" (Chipman)
"Send Me, Love, a Postal Card" (Corliss)

1904 musicals